Bhagwat Jha Azad was an Indian freedom fighter and politician. He served as Chief Minister of Bihar from 14 February 1988 to 10 March 1989. He was at various times a member of parliament and a member of the Bihar state legislature.

Political career
Azad was a 20-year-old college student  when he took part in a demonstration as part of the Quit India Movement in 1942. He was hit by a bullet in his leg, which incident made him famous in the press. After this, there was no going back for the young man, and a glittering political career was born. Later, Azad was also arrested several times by the British.

Independence came in 1947, exactly five years after the Quit India Movement, and Azad was advantageously poised to make a career in politics. He was part of an influential cohort of politicians from Bihar who gained prominence on the national stage during the post-independence stage, known as the "Young Turks." He was a contemporary of Bindeshwari Dubey, Abdul Gafoor, Chandrashekhar Singh, Satyendra Narayan Sinha and Kedar Pandey (all future chief ministers of Bihar); and of Sitaram Kesri, future national president of Indian National Congress.

Azad represented Bhagalpur constituency in the Lok Sabha for five terms. He was elected to the third, fourth, fifth, seventh and eighth Lok Sabha. He served as a Union minister of state from 1967 to 1983 in the ministries of agriculture, education, labour and employment, supply and rehabilitation, civil aviation and food and civil supplies. He was a veteran Congressman, and Chief Minister of Bihar between 14 February 1988 and 10 March 1989.

Well known cricketer Kirti Azad and ex IPS officer Yashovardhan Azad are his sons.

Bhagwat Jha Azad died in 2011 aged 89. He had been ailing for several years.

References

1922 births
2011 deaths
Chief Ministers of Bihar
People from Bihar
Indian independence activists from Bihar
India MPs 1962–1967
India MPs 1967–1970
India MPs 1971–1977
India MPs 1980–1984
India MPs 1984–1989
Patna University alumni
People from Bhagalpur
Lok Sabha members from Bihar
Indian National Congress politicians
Chief ministers from Indian National Congress
Prisoners and detainees of British India